Kaah Political Association is a ruling political party in Puntland.

History
On 21 May 2020, President of Puntland Said Abdullahi Dani joined the party.

On 15 July 2020, the members of Federal Government of Somalia has met with Said Deni at the party's headquarters in Mogadishu.

On 18 July 2020, a party conference was held, where Said Dani was elected its chairman. The Central Committee has also elected Ahmed Elmi Osman Karaash as the 1st Vice Chairman of Kaah. The Speaker of the House of Representatives Mr. Abdirashid Yusuf Jibril Awl was also elected as the 2nd Vice Chairman of Kaah.

On 26 November 2020, Said Deni held a meeting with party leaders and members.

See also 
 Political parties in Somalia

References

External links 
Facebook page
Twitter page
YouTube page

Political parties in Somalia
Garowe